The 1989 All-Ireland Senior Hurling Championship Final was the 102nd All-Ireland Final and the culmination of the 1989 All-Ireland Senior Hurling Championship, an inter-county hurling tournament for the top teams in Ireland. The match was held at Croke Park, Dublin, on 3 September 1989, between Tipperary, managed by Bab's Keating and Antrim, managed by Jim Nelson. The game was shown live in Ireland on Network 2 with match commentary provided by Ger Canning and comments throughout provided by Jimmy Magee.
The Ulster champions lost to their Munster opponents on a score line of 4-24 to 3-9.

Tipperary had led at half time by 1-13 to 0-5 with their goal coming from Declan Ryan who scored when his high long range shot for a point hit the hurley of the Antrim goalkeeper Niall Patterson on its way into the net after 18 minutes.

The game is notable for a number of reasons.  This was Antrim's second ever appearance in an All-Ireland final, some forty-six years after they lost to Cork at the same stage of the championship.  Nicky English set a scoring record for a single player in the modern era as he notched up 2-12 to win his first All-Ireland Senior medal.  The victory for Tipperary, eighteen years after their last in 1971, also preserved the county's unique record of winning an All-Ireland title in every decade of the GAA's existence. Tipperary were captained by Bobby Ryan.

Match details

MATCH RULES
70 minutes
Replay if scores level
Maximum of 3 substitutions

References

External links
Full Video of the final
Cover of 1989 All Ireland Final Programme

All-Ireland Senior Hurling Championship Final
All-Ireland Senior Hurling Championship Final
All-Ireland Senior Hurling Championship Final, 1989
All-Ireland Senior Hurling Championship Final
All-Ireland Senior Hurling Championship Finals
Antrim county hurling team matches
Tipperary county hurling team matches